Richard Strode may refer to:

Richard Strode (floruit 1512), tinner and British Member of Parliament for Plympton Erle, Devon
Richard Strode (died 1581), MP for Plympton Erle 1553 and 1559
Sir Richard Strode (1584–1669), MP for Bere Alston 1604, Bridport 1626 and Plympton Erle 1640
Richard Strode (1638–1707), British Member of Parliament for Plympton Erle from 1685-1689 and 1690